List of Native American deities, sortable by name of tribe or name of deity.

North American gods

South American deities

See also
Mythologies of the indigenous peoples of the Americas

References

American, North
Native American-related lists
.